
Year 494 (CDXCIV) was a common year starting on Saturday (link will display the full calendar) of the Julian calendar. At the time, it was known as the Year of the Consulship of Rufius and Praesidius (or, less frequently, year 1247 Ab urbe condita). The denomination 494 for this year has been used since the early medieval period, when the Anno Domini calendar era became the prevalent method in Europe for naming years.

Events 
 By place 
 Byzantine Empire 
 An earthquake devastates the port town of Latakia (modern Syria).

 China 
 Emperor Xiao Wen Di moves the capital of Northern Wei from Datong to Luoyang. He makes Chinese the official language of his court, and orders his nobility to adopt Chinese names. 

 By topic 
 Religion 
 Gelasius I delineates the relationship between church and state. 
 The Decretum Gelasianum is attributed.
 Gelasius I canonizes Saint George.

Births 
 Gildas, British historian and priest (approximate date)

Deaths 
 Xiao Zhaowen, emperor of  Southern Qi (b. 480)
 Xiao Zhaoye, emperor of Southern Qi (known as the Prince of Yulin) (b. 473)

References